Finlayson Lake Airport  is located adjacent to the south side of the Robert Campbell Highway near Ross River, Yukon, Canada.

References

Registered aerodromes in Yukon